Seton Catholic Central is a private Roman Catholic school located on the Westside of Binghamton, New York. It is run by the Catholic Schools of Broome County, which is part of the Roman Catholic Diocese of Syracuse. The school was ranked 14 out of 100 of the best Catholic schools in New York State by Niche in 2016.

Both religious and laypeople compose Seton's full- and part-time staff, who are active in the extracurricular student life at Seton as coaches, advisers, and moderators.

The School embraces interscholastic athletics as an experience that is an integral part of their overall academic mission. Sportsmanship, teamwork, discipline, commitment, fitness, social interaction and healthy competition are the cornerstones of the athletic program. Every year, 80% of the student-body competes on at least one interscholastic athletic team. Seton offers 15 sports programs at the Varsity, J.V. and Modified levels. Teams have won 7 New York State Championships and 14 NYSPHSAA Regional Championships.

School History
Seton Catholic Central was built in 1962 at 70 Seminary Ave in Binghamton and opened as Catholic Central High School in 1963. When the school merged as Seton Catholic Central High School in 1976, it housed students from both Catholic Central High School in Binghamton and Seton Catholic High School in Endicott, New York. The schools had to merge because of declining enrollments and a deficit. The Sisters of Charity, who staffed Seton, and the Sisters of St. Joseph, who staffed Catholic Central, were moved to the new school to be the main part of the faculty with Reverend VanAmburgh as the principal.

The class of 1977 was the first graduating class from Seton Catholic Central and had 281 members in it. Classes included math, science, English, foreign language (including Spanish), physical education, social studies, and business. Popular activities for students included chorus, newspaper, ski club, Marian Association, Key Club, mission club, pep club, bowling, and basketball.

In 2011, Seton Catholic Central High School became Seton Catholic Central when it opened its doors to students in 7th and 8th grades. Today Seton Catholic Central has students in grades 7- 12 and has approximately 355 students. The school offers many class options for all learning levels, as well as many sports and activities for all students. Students from all over the Binghamton area attend the school, as well as international students from places such as Germany, Italy and Asia.

Curriculum and academics
Advanced Placement courses:
Art History
Biology
Calculus AB
Chemistry
Computer Science
Economics (Macro and Micro)
English Language and Composition
English Literature and Composition
Environmental Science
European History
Latin
Physics C: Mechanics
Statistics
Studio Art
United States History
World History

Honors level courses:
English 2 Honors
English 4 Honors
Spanish 4 Honors

College credit courses:
Spanish (The University of Albany)
The Project Lead the Way Program (Rochester Institute of Technology)
Forensic Science (Broome Community College)
AP Chemistry (Broome Community College)

2016-17 Advanced Placement data:
 In the 2016–2017 school year, 95 Seton Catholic Central students in grades 10-12 took 206 AP exams in 19 subject areas
 74.3% of the scores were 3 and above
 43.2% of the scores were 4 and above
 In 2017, SCC had 14 AP Scholars, 8 AP Scholars with Honors, 13 AP Scholars with Distinction and 3 National AP Scholars.

2016 graduation data:
16%  Regents Diploma
64%  Regents Diploma with Advanced Designation
20%  Regents Diploma with Advanced Designation with Honors
7% earned a GPA of 100-103
21% earned a GPA of 95-99
ACT College Readiness Measures: 77% meet or exceed all four benchmarks vs 48% statewide

Student life
On March 23, 2017, the Seton Catholic Central Student Council ratified an updated Student Body Constitution pertaining to student government and elections, student organization, club chartering, and Catholic service. The school students and its administrators chose to adopt a House System of five separate Houses consisting of roughly 75 students of all grade levels.  The five Houses are each headed by a Senior Class Perfect as well as a Faculty Advisor.  The Class Boards, responsible for facilitating class service projects, events, dances, Proms, or fundraisers, are composed of five classmates from separate Houses. Houses meet on a bi-weekly schedule to plan student activities and Catholic Service Projects.

Seton Catholic Central Houses:
House of St. Catherine of Alexandria
House of Pope St. Gregory the Great
House of St. Ignatius of Loyola
House of St. John Neumann
House of St. Philomena

There are a large number of extracurricular student groups at Seton Catholic Central, under the direction of the Student Council which is composed of: an executive board and officers for each class. The school also has chapters of the National Honor Society, which was chartered on August 18, 1979, and Key Club International, which was rechartered on March 7, 2016.

High School Clubs:
Academic Challenge
Chinese Board Game Club
Creative Writing Club
History Club
Key Club
Mathletes
Mock Trial
Political Leaders of Tomorrow
Robotics
Science Olympiad
Seton Speaks
S.M.I.L.E Club
Spanish Club
Sustainability Club
Ukulele Club
Yes! Leads

Athletics record:
112 STAC Divisional Championships
21 STAC Conference Championships
84 Section IV Championships
14 NYSPHSAA Regional Championships
7 STATE CHAMPIONSHIPS

Sports teams:
Boys’ Modified/Varsity Football
Boys’ Modified/JV/Varsity Soccer
Boys’ Varsity Golf
Boys’ Modified/JV/Varsity Basketball 
Boys’ Modified/JV/Varsity Baseball
Boys’ Modified/Varsity Laccrose
Boys’ Varsity Tennis
Girls’ Modified/Varsity Tennis
Girls’ Modified/Varsity Soccer
Girls’ Modified/JV/Varsity Basketball 
Girls’ Modified/Varsity Softball
Girls’ Modified/Varsity Lacrosse
Boys and Girls’ Modified/Varsity Cross Country
Boys and Girls’ Varsity Swimming and Diving
Boys and Girls’ Modified/Varsity Track and Field

Alma mater and official school prayer

The Seton Catholic Central Alma Mater was written by Sister Mary Ellen Hogan, C.S.J. and is sung at every Varsity Boys' Basketball home game by the Stage Band and by students at other school athletic events. Its lyrics are:

Now lift your voice and raise a song,
For beauty and for truth.
For our dear Alma Mater,
the honor of our youth.
Oh, stand beside her colors,
Find courage at her side,
For green and white
For honor bright,
For loyalty and pride.

Here's to our own dear SCC,
Steadfast and true she stands.
Here's to our faithful green and white,
Leading loyal SAINTS to glory.
Proudly we raise her banner high,
Bravely defend her name.
Praise to our Alma Mater
To our own dear S C C H S.

The Seton Catholic Central High School Prayer of St. Elizabeth Ann Seton was written using excerpts and quotations from Mother Seton's writings, it reads as follows:

Lord God, You have given each of us
a great deal to do in this world.
We believe that You, God, have come to find us
wherever we may be in this life.
We believe that You, Lord God,
are always with us.
Help us to persevere when obstacles are in our way,
for You are our Guide and our Friend.
May we always be guided by Your divine will for us,
as we place our trust in You.

Saint Elizabeth Ann Seton – Pray for us!
Amen.

Notes and references

External links
Seton Catholic Central High School Official Website
Catholic Schools of Broome County Website

1963 establishments in New York (state)
Educational institutions established in 1963
Private high schools in Broome County, New York
Private middle schools in New York (state)
Catholic secondary schools in New York (state)
Roman Catholic Diocese of Syracuse